Klokot may refer to:

Klokot
Klokot, Bihać, a village in the municipality of Bihać, Bosnia and Herzegovina
, left tributary of the Una in Bosnia and Herzegovina

See also
Klokotnica (disambiguation)
Klokočevac (disambiguation)